Raymond Lau or Ray Lau may refer to:

 Raymond Lau, a developer of StuffIt, a computer software
 Raymond Lau, a character of The Unwritten Law (film), portrayed by Andy Lau
 Lau Kong-wah, a Hong Kong politician, also called Ray Lau